The San Jacinto Building in Beaumont, Texas was built between 1921–1922 and was completed for the San Jacinto Life Insurance Company. The building is 15 stories tall and supports a large clock tower on top. Each dial is 17 feet in diameter. The building was altered in the 1950s with the removal of a "cupola" and the cornice that surrounded the building. It is privately owned today and is used as an office building. The building contributes to the Beaumont Commercial District.

Gallery

See also

National Register of Historic Places listings in Jefferson County, Texas

References

External links

San Jacinto Building on Google Maps

Office buildings completed in 1922
Buildings and structures in Beaumont, Texas
Neoclassical architecture in Texas
Office buildings on the National Register of Historic Places in Texas
Clock towers in Texas
Historic district contributing properties in Texas
National Register of Historic Places in Jefferson County, Texas